Nova Venécia is a Brazilian municipality in the state of Espírito Santo. Its population was 50,434 (2020) and its area is 1,448 km². The seat of the municipality is at 65 meters above sea level.

Notable people
 Richarlison: Football player for Tottenham Hotspur and Brazil

References

Municipalities in Espírito Santo